Drowning in the Fountain of Youth is the second album by Australian act Dan Kelly & The Alpha Males. The album received positive reviews in the local music scene, and was considered for the Album of 2006 by Melbourne street magazine, Inpress. The album provided a single, "Drunk on Election Night"; the track was included by Neil Young in his website's playlist: Living with War - Songs of the Times, in late 2006.

Drowning in the Fountain of Youth peaked at No. 8 on the ARIA Hitseekers Albums Chart and Kelly was nominated for Best Male Artist for the release at the ARIA Music Awards of 2007.

At the J Award of 2006, the album was nominated for Australian Album of the Year.

Track listing

In-Fidelity (SHK INFCD-125)
 "Safeway Holiday (Get Wise)"
 "Babysitters of the World Unite"
 "Drowning in the Fountain of Youth (Plastic Surgery Jam)"
 "I Will Release Myself (Unto You)"
 "Fire & Theft (The Landscape Gardners Dream)"
 "My Brains Are On Fire! (Life Coach Baby)"
 "Back on the Booze Again"
 "Mail Order Bride"
 "Drunk On Election Night"
 "The Lonely Coconut" 
 "Vice City Rolling"
 "Star of the Sea"

Personnel

 Dan Kelly – Guitar, vocals, Bass, keyboards, Glockenspiel 
 A. Ron Cupples - Guitar, Recorder
 Dan Luscombe - Keyboards, Vocals
 Lewis Boyes - Bass, Vocals
 Christian Strybosch – drums, Vocals

References 

2006 albums
Dan Kelly and the Alpha Males albums